This is a list of Prosecutors General of Azerbaijan from 1918 to the present day.

Azerbaijan Democratic Republic 
 Khalil Bey Khasmammadov (28 May 1918 – 17 June 1918 )
 Fatali Khan Khoyski (17 June 1918 – 7 December 1918 )
 Teymur Bey Makinski (26 December 1918 – 14 March 1919 )
 Aslan Bey Safikurdski (14 March 1919 – 22 December 1919 )
 Khalil Bey Khasmammadov (22 December 1919 – 1 April 1920 )

Azerbaijan Soviet Socialist Republic 
 Aliheydar Garayev (28 April 1920 – 1921)
 Ivanov (1921 – 1922)
 Bahadir Valibayov (1922 – 1926)
 Boyukaga Talibli (1926 – 1930)
 Husnu Hajiyev (1930– 1931)
 Boyukaga Talibli (1931 – 1932)
 Ayna Sultanova (1933 – 1934)
 Yagub Mammadov (1935 – 1936)
 Bahadir Valibeyov (1930 – 1937)
 Agahuseyn Alihuseynov (1938 – 1941)
 Jabrayil Jabrayilzade (1941 – 1943)
 Khalil Afandiyev (1943 – 1948)
 Aliabbas Aliyev (1948 – 1951)
 Haji Rahimov (1951 – 1954)
 Adil Babayev (1951 – 1954)
 Seyfulla Akbarov (1951 – 1963)
 Gambay Mammadov (1963 – 1976)
 Abbas Zamanov (1976 – 1985)
 Ilyas Ismayilov (1985 – 1990)

Republic of Azerbaijan

References

External links
Site of The Office of the Prosecutor General
History of Prosecutor General's Office of the Republic of Azerbaijan

Lists of office-holders in Azerbaijan
Government ministers of Azerbaijan
Law enforcement-related lists